Euhedral crystals (also known as idiomorphic or automorphic crystals) are those that are well-formed, with sharp, easily recognised  faces. The opposite is anhedral (also known as xenomorphic or allotriomorphic): a rock with an anhedral texture is composed of mineral grains that have no well-formed crystal faces or cross-section shape in thin section. Anhedral crystal growth occurs in a competitive environment with no free space for the formation of crystal faces. An intermediate texture with some crystal face-formation is termed subhedral.

Crystals that grow from cooling liquid magma typically do not form smooth faces or sharp crystal outlines. As magma cools, the crystals grow and eventually touch each other, preventing crystal faces from forming properly or at all.

When snowflakes crystallize, they do not touch each other. Thus, snowflakes form euhedral, six-sided twinned crystals. In rocks, the presence of euhedral crystals may signify that they formed early in the crystallization of liquid magma or perhaps crystallized in a cavity or vug, without steric hindrance, or spatial restrictions, from other crystals.

Etymology

"Euhedral" is derived from the Greek eu meaning "well, good" and hedron meaning a seat or a face of a solid.

Relation of face orientation to microscopic structure

Euhedral crystals have flat faces with sharp angles. The flat faces (also called facets) are oriented in a specific way relative to the underlying atomic arrangement of the crystal: They are planes of relatively low Miller index. This occurs because some surface orientations are more stable than others (lower surface energy). As a crystal grows, new atoms attach easily to the rougher and less stable parts of the surface, but less easily to the flat, stable surfaces. Therefore, the flat surfaces tend to grow larger and smoother, until the whole crystal surface consists of these plane surfaces. (See diagram on right.)

See also
 Xenomorph (geology)
 Crystal habit
 Rock microstructure
 List of rock textures

Notes

References

 
 

Crystallography
Mineral habits
Petrology